The Cherry Street Bridge is a historic bridge located in Shell Rock, Iowa, United States. It was built by the Waterloo, Iowa bridge contractor A. Olson Construction Co. for $15,690 and completed in August 1929. It replaced an older through truss bridge, and originally had lights on the bulkheads of the guard rails. It was listed on the National Register of Historic Places in 1998.

References

Bridges completed in 1929
Buildings and structures in Butler County, Iowa
Road bridges on the National Register of Historic Places in Iowa
Arch bridges in Iowa
National Register of Historic Places in Butler County, Iowa
Concrete bridges in the United States